Qarah Day (also Romanized as Qarah Dāy and Qareh Dāy; also known as Qarā Dāy and Qara Deh) is a village in Pish Khowr Rural District, Pish Khowr District, Famenin County, Hamadan Province, Iran. At the 2006 census, its population was 254, in 52 families.

References 

Populated places in Famenin County